Rachel Morrison (born April 27, 1978) is an American cinematographer and director. For her work on Mudbound (2017), Morrison earned a nomination for an Academy Award for Best Cinematography, making her the first woman ever nominated in that category. She has twice worked with director Ryan Coogler, working on the films Fruitvale Station (2013), and Black Panther (2018).

Early life
Morrison took up photography at a young age. She grew up in a Jewish family in Cambridge, Massachusetts, and graduated from Concord Academy in 1996. She then attended New York University, where she completed a double major in film and photography because she was unable to choose between the two; by the end of her degree, she had decided to concentrate on cinematography. She then attended the AFI Conservatory's graduate cinematography program and graduated with a Master of Fine Arts in 2006.

Career
Morrison began her career in television, working on series and telefilms for a number of networks. Her cinematography on the 2005 television documentary Rikers High, about high school education within the Rikers Island prison complex, was nominated for an Emmy Award.

Morrison worked on The Hills for two years, then shot Zal Batmanglij's Sound of My Voice, which premiered at the 2011 Sundance Film Festival. Over the next two years, she photographed Tim and Eric's Billion Dollar Movie and Fruitvale Station, which premiered at Sundance in 2012 and 2013 respectively, as well as Any Day Now (2012), Some Girl(s) (2013) and The Harvest (2013).

At the 2013 Women in Film Crystal + Lucy Awards, Morrison was awarded the Kodak Vision Award for her work in cinematography and her collaboration with other women filmmakers. The same year, Variety named her as one of the "Up Next" in their Below The Line Impact Report, while Indiewire named her as one of their "Cinematographers To Watch".

In 2014, she photographed Cake, directed by Daniel Barnz, which she followed up with the 2015 film Dope. Dope premiered at the 2015 Sundance Film Festival, making it Morrison's seventh film to screen at the annual festival in six consecutive years.

2014 marked Morrison's first foray into directing, as she was offered the chance to direct an episode of the television series American Crime, which aired in 2015. In 2017 she became a member of the American Society of Cinematographers.

Morrison was the cinematographer for Dee Rees's 2017 film Mudbound. For her work on the film, Morrison became the first woman to win the New York Film Critics Circle Award for Best Cinematographer, the first woman to be nominated for the feature category of the American Society of Cinematographers Outstanding Achievement Awards, and the first woman ever nominated for the Academy Award for Best Cinematography.

Morrison served as cinematographer for Marvel's Black Panther (2018).

In January 2023, Morrison was announced as a director of the Star Wars streaming series The Mandalorian season 3, which was released in March 2023.

Personal life
Morrison married Rachel Garza in December 2011. They have one son, who was born in 2014, and a daughter born in 2018.

Filmography

Film

As director
 Flint Strong (TBA)

Television
As cinematographer

As director

Other awards

References

External links

1978 births
American cinematographers
20th-century American Jews
LGBT people from California
Living people
Tisch School of the Arts alumni
AFI Conservatory alumni
American women cinematographers
Concord Academy alumni
LGBT people from Massachusetts
People from Cambridge, Massachusetts
New York University alumni
21st-century American Jews